Duani is a surname. Notable people with the surname include:

Roni Duani (born 1986), Israeli singer, model, actress, television host, and entrepreneur
Rami Duani (born 1987), Israeli footballer

See also
Duany